Fuerte Olimpo is a city in Paraguay. It is the capital of the department of Alto Paraguay. It was originally called Fuerte Borbón. The city is also known as “la puerta de entrada al Pantanal”, or entrance to the Pantanal region.

Fuerte Olimpo is on east of Chaco Boreal on east shore of Paraguay River near the mouth of Blanco River, to the north the moist ground called humedales from the Gran Pantanal. Fuerte Olimpo is far away from the flood area. 
The city is surrounded by a wall 4 km long.

Geography
This plain is almost 300 metres above the sea level. The soil is good for farming and cattle raising. Laguna Capitán is a lagoon in Fuerte Olimpo.
Fuerte Olimpo is between two hills, in one is Fuerte Bordón and in the other one is Maria Auxiliadora Cathedral.
The hill 3 hermanos are elevations of the region, on top of the middle cerro palms of karanday can be seen and also the moist ground of the Pantanal Nabileque and Sierra de Bordón in Brazil.

Weather 

Long droughts followed by strong rains are important characteristics of the region.

Demography

Fuerte Olimpo is a city with 4998 inhabitants, 2585 men and 2413 women, according to the Census.

History

The city was founded by Spain in 1792 named Fuerte Borbón by the Governor Joaquín Alos y Bru, who sent the Commandant José Antonio de Zavala y Delgadillo, to protect the area from the Virreinato del Río de la Plata from the bandeirantes from Brazil. The first settlement was between the Brazilian Forte Porto Carrero and Fecho dos Morros. Caciques Mbayaes were invited for the foundation.

During José Gaspar Rodríguez de Francia government it was called Fuerte Olimpo, maybe because of the main Cerro (hill) which was said to resemble Mount Olimpus in ancient Greece. At that time Paraguayan sovereignty established a free port for Brazilian trading.

At the beginning of Paraguayan War (1865–1870) it was a very important offensive spot in the Mato Grosso, in 1866 Fuerte Olimpo was a strategic place too but it was taken by Brazilians when the campaign ended. Originally, Argentina wanted to own from Fuerte Olimpo to Chaco Boreal to the Bahía Negra, but when Brazil left Paraguay, Argentina did not claim it.

After the 1870s the area belonged to large landowners who chopped the quebrechales having native people work as slaves, that period was called tannin cycle, it was the beginning of some industries, forests were destroyed and the place was used for cattle raising good for the kind of weather. Another important aspect was the industries of tiles, palm and bricks. So Fuerte Olimpo became a port for exportation. During the Chaco war in the 1930s Fuerte Olimpo was again an important place for offensive strategies.

Economy

It includes some ports:
14 de Mayo,
Esperanza,
Leda,
Lida, and
Maria Elena.

The main activity is cattle raising.

Transportation

Boats and canoes are the main important means of transportation to get to Fuerte Olimpo. People travel in the riverboat Aquidabán, which goes from Concepción to Bahía Negra.
Another way to go there is going Route 9 “The Transchaco highway” to “Cruce Pioneros”, at km. 409, there is no paved route to get to Fuerte Olimpo.
You can also get to Loma Plata, at km 444 and there is no paved route until km. 333.
There is also a landing runway for small planes.

Tourism

Fuerte Borbón, from 1792. Built from rocks on one of the Olimpo hills.
María Auxiliadora Cathedral, on top of the other hill, built of stone.
An observatory: the three hills of Fuerte Olimpo: called "Tres Hermanos".
A museum and a native tribe called Ishir “Virgen Santísima”, which includes presentation of some crafts and a welcome from the Shaman.
You can also ride some motor launches on the Paraguay River to enjoy the wonderful flora and fauna of the region. There are some tourist guides.

See also 
 Mary Help of Christians Cathedral, Fuerte Olimpo

Bibliography and references
 Geografía Ilustrada del Paraguay, Distribuidora Arami SRL; 2007. 
 Geografía del Paraguay, Primera Edición 1999, Editorial Hispana Paraguay SRL

References

External links
Secretaria Nacional de Turismo
Coordenadas Geográficas e Imágenes Satelitales: Fuerte Olimpo
site, showing photos of a farm close to Fte Olimpo

 
Populated places in the Alto Paraguay Department
Fuerte Olimpo District
Pantanal
Populated places established in 1792